Aminuddin Ponulele (5 July 1939 – 27 January 2021) was an Indonesian academic and politician who served as Governor of Central Sulawesi from 2001 to 2006. He also served as the speaker of the Central Sulawesi Provincial House of Representatives from 2009 to 2019. He also ran as a candidate for governor in the Central Sulawesi Provincial General Election in 2011.

Aminuddin died on 27 January 2021 at the age of 81.

References 

1939 births
2021 deaths
People from Palu
Governors of Central Sulawesi